Agrammia is a genus of moths of the family Crambidae.

Species
Agrammia iridalis Guenée, 1854
Agrammia matronalis Guenée, 1854

References

Spilomelinae
Crambidae genera
Taxa named by Achille Guenée